Pseudargynnis is a monotypic butterfly genus. The single species Pseudargynnis hegemone, the false fritillary, is a butterfly in the family Nymphalidae. It is found in eastern Nigeria, Cameroon, the Republic of the Congo, Angola, the southern part of the Democratic Republic of the Congo, southern Sudan, Uganda, Burundi, western Kenya, western Tanzania, Malawi, northern Zambia, Mozambique and Zimbabwe. The habitat consists of open grassy and marshy habitats in tropical savanna and open forests.

The larvae feed on Dissotis species (including D. denticulata) and possibly Antherotoma naudinii.

References

Limenitidinae
Monotypic butterfly genera
Taxa named by Ferdinand Karsch
Nymphalidae genera